My Songs: 1989–2021 is a career-spanning anthology by Australian singer songwriter Archie Roach, released on 11 March 2022. The album will be supported with Roach's "last road tour of NSW". The album was nominated for Album of the Year at the National Indigenous Music Awards 2022. The album debuted on the ARIA chart at number 68 in the week following his death on 30 July 2022.

Track listing

Charts

References

2022 compilation albums
Archie Roach albums
Mushroom Records compilation albums
Compilation albums by Australian artists